Kelly Kerney (born 1979) is an American novelist. Her first novel, Born Again, was published in 2006, and her second novel, Hard Red Spring, was published in 2016.

Career
After having been raised in a Pentecostal Church, Kerney graduated from Bowdoin College in 2002 and later received her MFA from the University of Notre Dame.

Her first novel Born Again follows an evangelical Christian who comes to terms with evolution. The novel received several positive reviews, including ones from Entertainment Weekly, the San Francisco Chronicle, The New York Times, and Pulitzer Prize-winner Richard Russo.

Novels
Born Again (2006)
Hard Red Spring (2016)

References

External links
 Harcourt Books
 Bowdoin Magazine profile

American women novelists
Bowdoin College alumni
University of Notre Dame alumni
Living people
21st-century American novelists
21st-century American women writers
1979 births